Dunderdalen is a valley on Wedel Jarlsberg Land within the Sør-Spitsbergen National Park, on the southwestern part of Spitsbergen, Svalbard. The valley has a length of about 16 km, and opens into Dunderbukta.

References

Valleys of Spitsbergen